The Economics and Statistics Administration (ESA) was an agency within the United States Department of Commerce (DOC) that analyzed, disseminated, and reported on national economic and demographic data.

Its three primary missions were the following:
 Release and disseminate U.S. National Economic Indicators.
 Oversee the missions of the United States Census Bureau (Census) and the Bureau of Economic Analysis (BEA).
 Analyze and produce economic reports for the Department of Commerce and the Executive Branch.

References

External links
 
 Economics and Statistics Administration in the Federal Register
 List of ESA Reports
 Economicindicators.gov, the Administration's official compilation of economic indicators
 Census.gov
 BEA.gov

United States Department of Commerce agencies
Federal Statistical System of the United States